Seldon Powell (15 November 1928 – 25 January 1997) was an American soul jazz, swing, and R&B tenor saxophonist and flautist born in Lawrenceville, Virginia.

He worked with Tab Smith (1949), Lucky Millinder (1949–51), Neal Hefti, Louis Bellson, and Jimmy Witherspoon. During the 1960s he ventured into the soul jazz idiom and worked with Clark Terry, Lou Donaldson, Johnny Hammond Smith, and Buddy Rich.

Discography

As leader
 Sedon Powell Plays (Roost 1955 [1956], reissued by Roulette, 1973))
 Seldon Powell featuring Jimmy Cleveland (Roost, 1956)
 Rhythm Plus One (Fresh Sound, 1956 [1984], LP reissue of selections from the above)
 At the Hop (PMI)
 Messin' with Seldon Powell (Encounter, 1973)

As sideman
With Tony Aless
Long Island Suite (Roost, 1955)

With Mose Allison
Hello There, Universe (Atlantic, 1970)

With Albert Ayler
New Grass (Impulse!, 1968)

With Chet Baker
Baker's Holiday (Limelight, 1965)

With Gato Barbieri
Chapter Three, Viva Emiliano Zapata (Impulse!, 1974)

With Aaron Bell
Music from Peter Gunn (Lion, 1959)
Music from Victory at Sea (Lion, 1959)

With Louis Bellson
The Driving Louis Bellson (Norgran, 1955)

With Billy Butler
Guitar Soul! (Prestige, 1969)

With Anthony Braxton
Creative Orchestra Music 1976 (Arista, 1976)

With Rusty Bryant
Until It's Time for You to Go (Prestige, 1974)

With Charlie Byrd
Byrd at the Gate (Riverside, 1963)

With Hank Crawford
 Mr. Blues Plays Lady Soul (Atlantic, 1969)

With Bobby Donaldson
Jazz Unlimited (Golden Crest, 1960)

With Charles Earland
Charles III (Prestige, 1973)

With Art Farmer
The Aztec Suite (United Artists, 1959)

With Jimmy Forrest
Soul Street (New Jazz, 1962)

With Ronnie Foster
Sweet Revival (Blue Note, 1972)

With Panama Francis
The beat behind million sellers (ABC, 1960)
Tough Talk (20th Century Fox, 1964)

With Friedrich Gulda
Friedrich Gulda at Birdland (RCA Victor, 1957)
A Man of Letters (Decca, 1957)
With Eddie Harris
Silver Cycles (Atlantic, 1968)

With Neal Hefti
Hot'n Hearty (Epic, 1955)

With Groove Holmes
Night Glider (Groove Merchant, 1973)

With Quincy Jones
Quincy Jones Explores the Music of Henry Mancini (Mercury, 1964)
Quincy Plays for Pussycats (Mercury, 1965)

With Rufus "Speedy" Jones
Five on Eight (Cameo)

With Looking Glass
Subway Serenade (Epic, 1973)

With Ahmed Abdul-Malik
Spellbound (Status, 1964)

With Arif Mardin
Journey (Atlantic, 1974)

With Les McCann
Les McCann Plays the Hits (Limelight, 1966)
Comment (Atlantic, 1970)
Another Beginning (Atlantic, 1974)

With Jack McDuff
The Fourth Dimension (Cadet, 1974)

With Gary McFarland
Soft Samba (Verve, 1963)

With Jimmy McGriff
The Big Band (Solid State, 1966)

With Blue Mitchell
Many Shades of Blue (Mainstream, 1974)

With Modern Jazz Quartet
Jazz Dialogue (Atlantic, 1965)

With David "Fathead" Newman
Bigger & Better (Atlantic, 1968)

With Chico O'Farrill
Nine Flags (Impulse!, 1966)

With Sy Oliver
Annie Laurie (Sesac, 1960)
Easy Walker (Sesac, 1962)

With Jimmy Owens
Headin' Home (A&M/Horizon, 1978)

With Oliver Nelson
The Spirit of '67 with Pee Wee Russell (Impulse!, 1967)

With Reuben Phillips
Manhattan...3 a.m. (Poplar, 1960)

With Bernard Purdie
Soul Drums (Date, 1967)
Stand By Me (Whatcha See Is Whatcha Get) (Mega, 1971)
Soul Is... Pretty Purdie (Flying Dutchman, 1972)

With Buddy Rich
The Driver (EmArcy, 1960)

With Willie Rodriguez
Flatjacks (Riverside, 1964)

With A. K. Salim
Blues Suite (Savoy, 1958)

With Eddie Sauter
The Sauter-Finegan Orchestra – Directions in Music (RCA, 1952–58)

With Johnny "Hammond" Smith
Black Coffee (Riverside, 1962)
Look Out! (New Jazz, 1962)
Open House! (Riverside, 1963)

With Leon Spencer
Where I'm Coming From (Prestige, 1973)

With Sonny Stitt
Sonny Stitt Plays Arrangements from the Pen of Quincy Jones (Roost, 1955)
I Keep Comin' Back! (Roulette, 1966)

With Billy Taylor
Billy Taylor with Four Flutes (Riverside, 1959)
Brazilian Beat (Sesac, 1963)

With Clark Terry
Color Changes (Candid, 1960)
What makes Sammy swing (20th Century Fox, 1963)

With Joe Thomas
Joy of Cookin' (Groove Merchant, 1972)

With Teri Thornton
Devil May Care (Riverside, 1961)

With Cal Tjader
Warm Wave (Verve, 1964)
Soul Burst (Verve, 1966)

With Ernie Wilkins
The Big New Band of the 60's (Everest, 1960)

With Jimmy Witherspoon
Goin' to Kansas City Blues (RCA Victor, 1958) with Jay McShann

References

1928 births
1997 deaths
American jazz saxophonists
American male saxophonists
American jazz flautists
Soul-jazz flautists
Swing flautists
Soul-jazz saxophonists
Swing saxophonists
American rhythm and blues musicians
People from Lawrenceville, Virginia
20th-century American saxophonists
Jazz musicians from Virginia
20th-century American male musicians
American male jazz musicians
20th-century flautists